Walter Feistritzer (21 April 1920 – January 1981) was an Austrian ice hockey player. He competed in the men's tournament at the 1948 Winter Olympics.

References

External links
 

1920 births
1981 deaths
20th-century Austrian people
Austrian ice hockey players
Ice hockey people from Vienna
Ice hockey players at the 1948 Winter Olympics
Olympic ice hockey players of Austria